Coreopsis hamiltonii, the Mt. Hamilton coreopsis, is a rare California species of Coreopsis in the family Asteraceae. It is found only in a small region including Mount Hamilton and the Diablo Range in the southwestern San Francisco Bay Area (Alameda, Santa Clara, and Stanislaus Counties).

Description
The foliage is low growing, producing  bright golden yellow colored flower heads and red purplish tinted peduncles. The foliage is deeply cut with a thin ferny shape.

References

External links
 Jepson Manual Treatment: Coreopsis hamiltonii
 United States Department of California Plants Profile 
 Coreopsis hamiltonii — University of California Calphotos Photo gallery

hamiltonii
Endemic flora of California
Natural history of the California chaparral and woodlands
Natural history of the California Coast Ranges
~
Natural history of the San Francisco Bay Area
Plants described in 1906
Natural history of Santa Clara County, California